Matthieu Tota (born 26 September 1985), artistically known as Matt Pokora and later M. Pokora, is a French pop and R&B singer. In 2016, he became a coach for The Voice Kids France and The Voice: la plus belle voix.

Early life 

Matthieu Tota is the son of professional footballer André Tota and Brigitte. His parents divorced in 1998 when he was 13 years old. As a child, he studied in an elementary school in Hohberg, and later at Collège Paul-Émile Victor in Mundolsheim, and Lycée Aristide Briand in Schiltigheim near Strasbourg. When he was younger, football was his first ambition and he wanted to become a professional player. However, he later opted for music.

Matthieu Tota explained the origin of his stage name Matt Pokora in an interview during the documentary Mise à jour broadcast on 26 August 2010 on NRJ 12 TV channel. He said he was searching for an artistic name and happened to be talking to his grandmother of Polish origin and the importance of humility came up. He asked her "how do we say 'humility' in Polish", and she said "pokora". Tota immediately decided to adopt the word as his stage name.

He earned some public attention as a member of French R&B group Mic Unity. He is also referred to the "French prince of crunk music".

In Popstars and Linkup 

In the fall of 2003, he participated in the third season of Popstars, a French talent reality television show broadcast on M6. The concept of the program was to present possible candidates the winners of which would take part in the formation of a boy band or girl band. He was a crowd and jury favourite, and became a member of a boy band called Linkup formed with Lionel and Otis, two other winners in 2003 Popstars. The female winners were formed into another group Diadems formed of Marylore, Angel, Pookie, Ophélie and Alexandra. In the final showdown, the boy band including Matthieu Tota won the series over the girl band Diadems, who ended up runners-up.

Their first Linkup single "Mon Étoile" was very successful topping French charts, and the debut album Notre Étoile was moderately successful. However the second single release "Une seconde d'éternité" was much less successful despite good sales.

The band tried again their hand in a collaboration with the British boy band Blue making a bilingual English/French version with Blue based on the latter's song "Bubblin'". The bilingual English/French Blue/Linkup version was entitled "You & Me Bubblin". Soon afterwards, Linkup disbanded due to poor performance of sales on releases.

Solo career

M. Pokora (2004/2005) 

In 2004, soon after the break-up of Linkup, Matthieu started working preparing for a solo career collaborating with the producers Kore & Skalp.

Under the stage name Matt Pokora, he released his first eponymous solo album originally entitled Matt Pokora. In 2005, he was forced to change his chosen name after a lawsuit from French R&B singer Matt Houston. As a result, he changed his stage name to M. Pokora and re-released the album as M. Pokora.

The debut single from M. Pokora was very successful. Called "Showbiz (The Battle)", it was a Top 10 hit in France, and also charted in Belgium and Switzerland. The second single Elle me contrôle featuring Sweety reached #6 in France and Pokora received two NRJ Music Awards for the single. Yet a third successful single was released called "Pas sans toi". The album released on Universal was certified gold.

He also started collaborating with Hakim Ghorab who became his long-time choreographer and took part in many of his music videos. He also developed a close collaboration with music video director Karim Ouaret who directed most of his successful videos.

Player (2006/2007) 

In January 2006, his second album Player was released topping the French chart. For producing the new album, he collaborated with Belgian producers Bionix, Rachid Mir and Christian Dessart and artists Red Rat and Zoxea and geared toward the younger and feminine fan brackets. He also enjoyed great popularity with gay audiences. The first single from his second album was the very successful "De retour" featuring Tyron Carter. That was followed with single "Oh la la la (Sexy Miss)" with Red Rat.

During a concert organized by NRJ Radio in France, he met Puerto Rican singer Ricky Martin and Martin asked M. Pokora to make a collaboration on Martin's hit "It's Alright". The result was a bilingual French/English Ricky Martin/M. Pokora release also entitled "It's Alright" that sold more than 100,000 copies. Finally, a last single from the Player album followed called "Mal de guerre", which was a relative success. M. Pokora released Player in a second edition in March 2006 with the bonus track added of the duet with Ricky Martin.

To promote the album and capitalize on its success, M. Pokora engaged in a tour of more than 30 French venues under the title Player Tour that culminated in a big sold-out concert at Palais Omnisports de Paris-Bercy. At the end of the tour, a DVD containing materials from the shows was marketed under the name Player Tour Live. The DVD also included a photo book and memories from the tour.

Pokora also created his own label M2theP Entertainment, signing his protégé, the rapper Tyron Carter. In addition to being featured on "De retour", Tyron Carter released "Ne me dis pas" that featured M. Pokora, a Top 30 hit, followed by an album Mon hold-up.

MP3 (2008/2009) 

After end of the Player Tour, Pokora left Universal and signed with EMI France. Also desiring a more international profile, he went to New York and created contacts most importantly with producers Ryan Leslie and J. R. Rotem. The result was his third album MP3 that was released on 24 March 2008, containing 14 tracks, including 12 in English. The title of the album was a play on his name Matt Pokora (MP) and the number 3 (his third album) but also referring to the popular gadget MP3, the audio format for consumer audio storage. Pokora promoted the launching of the album with a prerelease of single "Dangerous" featuring American hip hop artist Timbaland and Sebastian, Timbaland's brother and the timing of the release was picked to coincide with the NRJ Music Awards of 2008.

The album reached #7 with estimated physical sales of 200,000 copies and additional downloads of 151,000. The album was certified gold. The album also did well internationally charting in Finland, Germany, Mexico, Belgium and in his homeland Poland where he won the Polish Eska Music Awards as the "International hip hop Artist of the Year".

After the success of "Dangerous", Pokora released a second single "They Talk Sh#t About Me" that features the young English rapper Natalia Kills credited on the release by her stage name  Verse. The single unlike "Dangerous" (that had reached #1) was not played heavily on French radio because of English-language content and managed to reach only #24. A third release from MP3, namely "Catch Me If You Can" was made with the music video featuring Julie Ricci. She is known for her appearances on Top Model in 2007 on M6 and in Secret Story in its 4th season on TF1. The single failed to make it to the French charts, but was successful in Poland reaching #11. The follow up "Through The Eyes" was also a relative success in Poland reaching #31 in the Polish charts.

To coincide with MP3 release, M. Pokora launched his Catch Me Tour 2008 ending with a concert in Palais Omnisports de Paris-Bercy on 18 November 2008. He also toured Belgium (6 December), Switzerland (13 December) ending with a final concert in Lyon, France on 14 December 2008.

Mise À Jour / Updated (2010/2011) 

Fourth studio album titled Mise à jour was released on 23 August 2010. The lead single "Juste une photo de toi" was released on 7 June 2010 and was a big hit reaching #4 in the French Albums Chart. It includes collaborations with Wayne Beckford, Gee Futuristic, X-Plosive, Astro Boyz, Tarz, STX and Bionix. Simultaneously a Mis à jour Édition Deluxe was released that in addition to the original 15 tracks of Mis à jour also contained seven new tracks exclusive for the Deluxe edition (including six in English).

The first single from the album was "Juste une photo de toi" released concurrently with the launching of the album. On 22 January 2011, during the NRJ Music Awards, the song was chosen as "Song of the Year" in addition to M. Pokora being chosen "French Male Artist of the Year".

To consolidate his international drive started with the MP3 album, he announced that an English version was under preparation. Finally the English version titled Updated was launched on 14 March 2011, containing 11 songs, mostly adaptations of the French-language hits on Mise à jour. Six of the titles were already known by the French public through the August 2010 Mise à jour Édition Deluxe release.

For promotion of the album, he organized a mini tour and a series of open-air concerts rather than concerts in halls.

In November 2010, a follow-up single "Mirage" was released accompanied with a new music video. The single received a great number of downloads, but not enough physical sales to reach the top of the charts and the single made only up to #64 despite the top position in downloads.

In January 2011, "Oblivion" an English-language version of "Mirage" was released with same arrangement but with new English lyrics for the international markets. The single was an opener for the release of Updated, destined for non-French markets of Mis à jour songs, but was made available for French markets as well.

In March 2011, M. Pokora announced a tour of 15 French cities, venues in Belgium and a final show in the Olympia. As a prelude, he also appeared in French, Belgian and Swiss clubs with dates from April to June 2011.

He also launched in March 2011 Mise à jour Version 2.0 that included extra materials including the Jean-Jacques Goldman, Carole Fredericks and Michael Jones classic "À nos actes manqués" which was destined to be his new single. It immediately became the number one physical single sales and reached the Top 10. The album Mise à jour Version 2.0 was made available on 18 April 2011, containing 17 titles including 14 form the original, the Jean-Jacques Goldman cover single three English-language titles from Updated and a new French track "Si on échangeait les rôles", the French version of Updateds "Finally Found Ya".

À la poursuite du bonheur (2012/2013) 

The fifth studio album À la poursuite du bonheur by French singer M. Pokora, was released on 20 March. The album's leading single "Juste un instant" was released on 30 January 2012 and reached number eighteen on the French singles chart. The album entered the French albums chart at number two. The second single from the album was "On est là" released in April 2012. In order to promote the album, M. Pokora embarked in a national tour in May 2012. The third single from the album was announced in the end of May; "Merci d'être" was officially released on 2 July 2012. The album is set to be re-issued on 19 November 2012; the new edition is set to include five new tracks, including the Jean-Jacques Goldman cover "Envole-moi" with singer Tal.

Robin Hood (2013/2014)

R.E.D. (2015/2016) 

M. Pokora's sixth studio album, R.E.D. / Rythmes Extrêmement Dangereux was released in France in February 2015.

My Way (2016) 

M. Pokora's seventh studio album, My Way was released in France on 21 October 2016, topping the French Album Charts in its initial week of release.

Pyramide (2019) 

M. Pokora's eighth studio album, Pyramide was released in France on 12 April 2019. The album reached the top of the French Charts upon its release.

Epicentre (2022) 
M. Pokora's ninth studio album, Epicentre  was released in France on 4 November 2022.

Acting career 

In 2011 Pokora voiced Duncan Rosenblatt, the main character of Firebreather, in the French dub of the Cartoon Network movie.

Robin des Bois (2013) 

M. Pokora appeared in the lead role of Robin Hood in the French musical comedy Robin des Bois (full title Robin des Bois: Ne renoncez jamais) that premiered on 26 September 2013 in Palais des congrès de Paris with performances in that venue extending to 10 November 2013. The act then toured all over France. The musical, a Gilbert Coullier, Roberto Ciurleo and RDB-P presentation, with musical mise en scène by Michel Laprise and text and music by Patrice Guirao and Lionel Florence is tipped as the musical event of 2013 in France.

The soundtrack for the musical was released on Capitol Records / EMI on 22 March 2013 and entered the SNEP official French Albums Chart in its first week of release eventually reaching number 3 and also reaching number 4 in the Belgian (Wallonia) francophone Singles Chart. It was released in two versions, the standard edition and the digipack limited edition.

Two tracks from the album as performed by M. Pokora have been released as singles. The first was "Le jour qui se rêve", a solo performance by Pokora, and "À nous", a hit performed by M. Pokora (Robin des Bois), Nyco Lilliu as Frère Tuck (Friar Tuck) and Marc Antoine as Petit Jean (Little John).

Personal life 

M. Pokora was troubled by the divorce of his parents and remained greatly attached to his mother after the divorce. He lived with her in Strasbourg before renting an apartment in Paris. His autobiographical song "Sur ma route" co-written by Jack Robinson, M. Pokora and Jordan Houyez from his album MP3 is about his experiences as a child in a broken home. He keeps contact with his father, who actively supports him.

He is an avid football fan and dreamed of a professional football career very early on. He is a big supporter of the French football club Olympique de Marseille, and takes part in many football events.

M. Pokora has been friends for many years with his personal choreographer Hakim Ghorab and his wife Aline and is godfather to their daughter Lola. He is also a friend of footballer Djibril Cissé and is godfather to one of his sons. He added a tattoo reading X as a tribute to him, because Cissé makes the X sign with his hands every time he scores. Cissé carries a similar X tattoo himself.

Pokora has been in a relationship with Christina Milian since August 2017. In January 2020, Milian gave birth to their son. In December 2020, a French magazine reported they were married, and that they were expecting a second child. In April 2021, they welcomed their second son.

Charities and public awareness 

From the start, and over many years, M. Pokora has been a great supporter of charity causes particularly HIV/AIDS and children charities. In 2004, he took part in the charity single "Chanter qu'on les aime", in support of Association Mondiale des Amis de l'Enfance (AMADE). In 2005, he was in  "Protège-toi", an AIDS charity single for Collectif Protection Rapprochée. In the same year, he was in "Et puis la terre...", a charity single for the tsunami victims under the name Artistes Solidaritie Ici pour Eux (A.S.I.E.) with a great number of French artists.

In 2006, he sang in "L'Or de nos vies", a charity single from Fight Aids. In 2007, he took part in two renditions: "Je fais de toi mon essentiel" by Emmanuel Moire and "S'aimer est interdit" by Anne-Laure Girbal both featured on the charity album "Le Roi Soleil – De Monaco à Versailles (LIVE) – Fight Aids".

In 2010, he appeared in Collectif Kilomaitre charity single "Un Respect mutuel", with many other hip hop and urban artists. He was associated with AIDES project and in 2010 sang a solo cover of Tracy Chapman's "Talking About a Revolution", on the charity album Message (AIDES)"

Pokora is a member of the Les Enfoirés charity ensemble since 2012.

 Tattoos

M Pokora is very famous for his body tattoos including:

 "POKORA" meaning humility in Polish (also the artist's adopted artistic name) inscribed on his right arm in capital letters
 "Only God Can Judge Me" on the right arm in English
 Chinese calligraphy signifying "Creativity", "Peace" and "Patience" surrounded by a dragon on his left shoulder
 The letter M signifying his name (Matthieu) surrounded by colorful flames on his left arm
 A tattoo on the calf symbolizing dancing
 An Arabic saying on his neck: قل الخير والا فاصمت, roughly 'Say good things or keep silent']
 "Ambition" on his lower back in Chinese calligraphy surrounded by chains and two wings.
 Letter X on his right wrist signifying brotherhood/friendship, as a tribute to his close friend Djibril Cissé, a footballer who makes the X sign with his arms every time he scores in a soccer game.
 A star between his left thumb and forefinger
 Star-flower near his left ear

In popular culture 

 M. Pokora took part three times in French television game and adventure competition series Fort Boyard in 2005, 2006 and 2009 winning with his team 3690, 28230 and 3000 euros respectively, all donated to charities.
 In 2006, he performed "Elle me contrôle" in the TV show La chanson de l'année alongside other notable artists
 In 2006, his song "Get Down On It" appeared on the soundtrack of Asterix and the Vikings
 In 2006, he took part in the French version of Muppets TV (broadcast on 31 December 2006)
 In 2007, he took part in Symphonic show special organized by Sidaction, a French AIDS charity
 In 2008, Sony Ericsson and EMI Music France his label offered in exclusivity the downloading of 7 songs from the MP3 album through the W380i as a promotional and sponsoring campaign.
 In April 2008, M. Pokora also gave an interview to French gay publication Têtu also appearing on its cover.
 He took part in "L'Or de nos vies", a charity song recorded for "Fight AIDS Monaco", an association of Princess Stéphanie of Monaco
 He also took part with a song in the album Message made available starting January 2010 with contribution from many artists including Christophe Willem, Jennifer, Anggun, Sliimy, Natasha St Pier, Daniel Powter, Lara Fabian. M. Pokora's contribution included "Talking About a Revolution", a cover of a Tracy Chapman hit.
 In 2011, he performed on Le show Johnny hosted by Johnny Hallyday
 Enjoying great popularity with children, M. Pokora has taken part in many broadcasts concentrated on kids, including a special on him on 25 May 2011 on L'École des fans presented by Philippe Risoli where children Gabin, Alicia, Romane, Yamin, Axel and Inès aged 5 to 7 years sang covers of his songs. He also interpreted his cover hit "À nos actes manqués" on the show. He was also co-sponsor with Hélène Ségara et Jean-Luc Reichmann of the second edition of TF1's show Le grand show des enfants broadcast on 30 April 2011.

 Winning Danse avec les stars
 On 19 March 2011 he won season 1 inaugural series of Danse avec les stars (the French version of Dancing with the Stars) with his partner Katrina Patchett getting 62% of the votes against 38% to runner-up Sofia Essaïdi.
This table shows the route of M.Pokora and Katrina Patchett in Danse Avec Les Stars.
In the final, the Freestyle wasn't rated.

{| class="wikitable"
|-  style="text-align:Center; background:#ccc; background:#ccc;"
| rowspan="2"|Week
| rowspan="2"|Dancing style
| rowspan="2"|Music
| colspan="3"|Judge points
| rowspan="2"|Total
| rowspan="2"|Ranking
| rowspan="2"|Result
|-  style="text-align:center; background:#ccc; background:#ccc;"
| style="width:10%; "|Alessandra Martines
| style="width:10%; "|Jean-Marc Généreux
| style="width:10%; "|Chris Marques
|-  style="text-align:center; background:#faf6f6;"
| |1
| |Quickstep
|"We No Speak Americano"—Yolanda Be Cool & DCUP
| |8
| |8
| |7
| |23/30
| |2/8
| |Safe
|-
| style="text-align:center; background:#faf6f6;"|2
| style="text-align:center; background:#faf6f6;"|Tango
| style="text-align:center; background:#faf6f6;"|"Roxanne"—The Police
| style="text-align:center; background:#faf6f6;"|8
| style="text-align:center; background:#faf6f6;"|9
| style="text-align:center; background:#faf6f6;"|8
| style="text-align:center; background:#faf6f6;"|25/30
| style="text-align:center; background:#faf6f6;"|1=/7
| style="text-align:center; background:#faf6f6;"|Safe
|-  style="text-align:center; background:#faf6f6;"
| |3
| |Foxtrot
Samba Marathon (+8 points)
|"Charlie's Angels Theme" – The Hit Crew (from Charlie's Angels)
"You Should Be Dancing" – Bee Gees (from Saturday Night Fever)
| 9
| 8
| 7
| |32/38
| |2/6
| |Safe
|-
| style="text-align:center; background:#faf6f6;"|4
| style="text-align:center; background:#faf6f6;"|Jive
Vienna Waltz
| style="text-align:center; background:#faf6f6;"|"Jailhouse Rock" – Elvis Presley
"If I Ain't Got You" – Alicia Keys
| style="text-align:center; background:#faf6f6;"|9
9
| style="text-align:center; background:#faf6f6;"|10
10
| style="text-align:center; background:#faf6f6;"|8
8
| style="text-align:center; background:#faf6f6;"|54/60
| style="text-align:center; background:#faf6f6;"|2/5
| style="text-align:center; background:#faf6f6;"|Safe
|-
| style="text-align:center; background:#faf6f6;"|5
| style="text-align:center; background:#faf6f6;"|Charleston
Rumba

Cha-cha-cha Marathon (+30 points)
| style="text-align:center; background:#faf6f6;"|"Charleston" – Green Hill Instrumental
"Angels" – Robbie Williams

"I Will Survive" – Gloria Gaynor
| style="text-align:center; background:#faf6f6;"|10 + 9
9 + 8
| style="text-align:center; background:#faf6f6;"|10 + 9
10 + 8
| style="text-align:center; background:#faf6f6;"|9 + 8
9 + 8
| style="text-align:center; background:#faf6f6;"|137/160
| style="text-align:center; background:#faf6f6;"|1/4
| style="text-align:center; background:#faf6f6;"|Safe
|-
| style="text-align:center; background:#faf6f6;"|6
| style="text-align:center; background:#faf6f6;"|Paso Doble
Foxtrot

Freestyle
| style="text-align:center; background:#faf6f6;"|"Thriller" – Michael Jackson
"Theme from New York, New York" – Frank Sinatra

"You're the One That I Want – Grease
| style="text-align:center; background:#faf6f6;"|10 + 10
10 + 10

N/A
| style="text-align:center; background:#faf6f6;"|10 + 9
10 + 9

N/A
| style="text-align:center; background:#faf6f6;"|9 + 9
10 + 8

N/A
| style="text-align:center; background:#faf6f6;"|114/120
| style="text-align:center; background:#faf6f6;"|1=/3
| style="text-align:center; background:#faf6f6;"|Winner (68%)
|}

 Discography 

 Albums 

 As part of Linkup
 2003: Notre étoile(as a member of Linkup)

 Solo
 2004: M. Pokora 2006: Player 2008: MP3 2010 / 2011: Mise à jour /Updated / Mise à jour Version 2.0 2012: À la poursuite du bonheur 2013: À la poursuite du bonheur Tour – Live à Bercy 2015: R.E.D. 2016: My Way 2019: Pyramide 2022: Epicentre  Special releases
 2013: À la poursuite du bonheur / Mise à jour (re-release)

 DVDs 

 2005 "Un an avec M. Pokora" (One year with M. Pokora)
 2006 "Player Tour"
 2007 "100% VIP" (with Alexandra Gas)
 2012 "A La Poursuite Du Bonheur Tour"
 2015 "M.Pokora 10 ans de Carrière Symphonic Show "

 Filmography 

 Tours 

 2006/2007 Player Tour 2008/2009 Catch Me Tour 2010/2011 Mise a jour Tour 2012 À la poursuite du bonheur – Tour 2012 2015   R.E.D Tour
 2017 My way Tour
 2019/2020   Pyramide Tour

 Books 
 2006: M. Pokora – La révolution R&B 2006: Et je me souviens, Editions K&B
 2008: M. Pokora vu par'', Éditions Broché
 2013: "De Mathhieu à Robin des Bois", Editions Dider Carpentier, by Cédric NAIMI
 2014: "M.Pokora, La véritable histoire", by Jérémy Lapage

References

External links 

 Official website (in French)
 M Pokora's official YouTube channel
 

1985 births
Living people
21st-century French singers
Popstars winners
Musicians from Strasbourg
French people of Polish descent
Danse avec les stars winners
French rappers
English-language singers from France
Universal Music Group artists
21st-century French dancers
21st-century French male singers
Crunk musicians